Cupidesthes ysobelae is a butterfly in the family Lycaenidae. It is found in Uganda, Tanzania (from the western part of the country to the Mpanda area) and possibly the Democratic Republic of the Congo.

References

Butterflies described in 1966
Lycaenesthini